Stepping Stone Pond is a small freshwater frozen pond 0.4 nautical miles (0.7 km) east-northeast of Craig Pond in the Labyrinth of Wright Valley, McMurdo Dry Valleys. So named by Advisory Committee on Antarctic Names (US-ACAN) (2004) following a visit by the United States Antarctic Program (USAP) field sampling party (2003–04), which reported the pond has perfect stepping stones that allow it to be crossed easily.

Lakes of Victoria Land
McMurdo Dry Valleys